or  is a mountain located in the city of Sakurai, Nara Prefecture, Japan.  It has been an important religious and historical mountain in Japan, especially during its early history, and serves as a holy site in Shinto.  The entire mountain is considered sacred, and is home to one of the earliest Shinto shrines, Ōmiwa Shrine.  Several burial mounds from the Kofun period can be found around the mountain.

The kami (spirit) generally associated with Mount Miwa is Ōmononushi  (Ōmono-nushi-no-kami), a rain kami.  However, the Nihon Shoki notes that there was a degree of uncertainly when it came to naming the principal kami of Mount Miwa, but he is often linked to Ōkuninushi.

Name

Mount Miwa was first described in the Kojiki as Mount Mimoro. It has also been written , another a phonetic spelling with the same pronunciation.

Early religion
Religious worship surrounding Mount Miwa has been deemed the oldest and more primitive of its kind in Japan, dating to pre-history. The very mountain itself is designated sacrosanct, and today's Ōmiwa Shrine still considers the mountain to be its shintai, or kami-body.  The kami residing on Mount Miwa was judged the most powerful by the Fujiwara clan, and consequently palaces and roads were built in the vicinity.

Pseudo-historical records

Installment of the Miwa (Ōmononushi) deity
The Nihon Shoki, Book V, (Chronicle of Emperor Sujin, 10th emperor) records that when the country was crippled by pestilence and subsequent mayhem, the emperor consulted the gods. The god Ōmononushi (whom some sources to the chronicle identify with the Mount Miwa deity) spoke through the mouth of an elder princess of the imperial house named  (daughter of 7th emperor Emperor Kōrei and Sujin's aunt) and revealed himself to be the deity residing in the borders of Yamato on Mount Miwa, and promised to bring end to chaos if he were properly worshipped. The emperor propitiated to the god but the effects were not immediate. Later, the same god appeared in a dream to and instructed him to seek out a man named , said to be the child of the god, and to install him as head priest of his cult.  Subsequently, normal order was restored and crops no longer failed.

Ōtataneko's genealogy and Miwa etymology
The  records that the first priest of the shrine, Ōtataneko declares himself the son born between the god and Ikutama yori-hime (or Ikudama-yori-bime).

Kojiki tells how it became known Ikutama yori-hime was divinely conceived. The beautiful girl was found to be pregnant, and claimed a handsome being had come to her at night. Her parents, in order to discover the identity of the man, instructed her to sprinkle red earth by her bedside, and thread a hemp cord (or skein) with a needle through the hem of his garment. In the morning, the hemp went through the hole of the door-hook so that only "three loops" were left. They trailed the remaining hemp thread to the shrine in the mountain, and that was how they discovered the visitation was divine.

Daughter of Ōmononushi of Miwa
The  also records another divine birth from an earlier period (under Emperor Jimmu). It tells how a maiden named Seya-datara was squatting in the toilet when the god transformed into the shape of a red-painted arrow and poked her in her privates. In astonishment, she picked up the arrow and placed it by the floor, whereby it transformed into a fine youth, who wound up marrying her. The girl child then born was named Hoto-tatara-i-susuki-hime (or Hotota-tara-i-susugi-hime),  being an old word for a woman's private parts.

Consort of the Miwa deity
Book V in the  adds the following episode. Suijin's aunt, the aforementioned Yamato-to-to-hi-momoso-hime, was later appointed the consort or wife of Ōmononushi (Mount Miwa). The kami however, would only appear to her at night, and the princess pleaded to reveal his true form.  The kami warned her not to be shocked, and agreed to show himself inside her comb box or toiletry case. The next day she opened the box and discovered a magnificent snake inside. She shrieked out in surprise, whereby the deity transformed into human form, promised her payback for shaming him so, and took off to Mount Mimoro (Mount Miwa).  The princess was so distraught at this, that she flopped herself on the seat stabbed herself in the pudenda with chopsticks, which ensued in her death.  She is supposedly buried at one of the six mounds near Mount Miwa, the  mound. The  version of this myth describes a union between a woman from the Miwa clan and Ōmononushi, resulting in the birth of an early Yamato king.  Scholars note that this is a clear effort to strengthen Yamato authority by identifying and linking their lineage to the established worship surrounding Mount Miwa.

Emperor Yūryaku
In , Book XIV, under Emperor Yūryaku year 7 (purportedly 463 A.D.), it is recorded that the emperor expressed the desire to get a glimpse of the deity of Mount Mimoro (Mount Miwa) and ordered a man known for his brute strength, named  to go capture it. Sugaru thereby climbed the mountain and captured and presented it to the emperor. But Yūryaku neglected to purify himself (by religious fasting, etc.) so that the great serpent made thunderous noise and made its eyes glare. The frightened emperor retreated to the palace, and had the snake released in the hill. He gave the hill a new name, .

Emishi
Records say that Yamato Takeru's sword Kusanagi was later placed in the keeping of the Atsuta Shrine, and that Takeru also presented a number of Emishi ("barbarians") hostages he quelled to the same shrine. The priestess however found them rowdy and mannerless, and so she handed them over to the imperial court.  The court settled them around the Mount Miwa area at first, but they would chopped down its trees, or make great hollers and frightened the villages. So their numbers were scattered and settled in five provinces, and they became the ancestors of the Saeki clans (Recorded in  Book VII, Emperor Keikō year 51 (purportedly 121 A.D.).

Much later in time, during Emperor Bidatsu year 10 (581 A.D.), Book XX), the Emishi were harassing the borderlands. The emperor summoned their leader named Ayakasu, and threatened the ringleaders of the ruffians with death. Whereby Ayakasu and the others entered Hatsuse-gawa (upper stream of Yamato River, sipped its water, and facing towards Mount Mimoro (Mt. Miwa), swore allegiance unto their descendants to the Yamato court.

Archaeology

Yamato leaders often ruled from palaces near sacred mountains, and built burial mounds around them, as it was a prominent sanctuary for both locals and Yamato kings alike.

Six tumuli have been found in the Shiki area at the base of Mount Miwa.  These earthen mounds were built between 250 AD to 350 AD, and all display the same keyhole shape and stone chambers found in earlier mounds.  However, the tumuli found at Mount Miwa hint at the beginning of a more centralized Yamato state.  All six mounds are exceptionally large, twice as large as any similar mounds found in Korea, and contain prolific amounts of mirrors, weapons, ornaments, as well as finely built wood and bamboo coffins.

They are as follows, in order of discovery:

Religious objects and pottery have also been found on and around the mountain.

Cultural references

 Mount Miwa was the subject of a waka poem by Princess Nukata, found in the Man'yōshū
 Mount Miwa was the site of a kendo tournament in Yukio Mishima's novel, Runaway Horses.

Geography

Japanese cedar (Cryptomeria, jp. sugi) grows all over the mountain and is considered a holy tree.

See also

 List of mountains and hills of Japan by height
 Ōmiwa Shrine
 Ōmononushi
 Ko-Shintō
 Jōmon period
 Kofun period

Notes

References

(primary sources)
, English translation
Reprint (Boston, Tuttle, 2005) .
  sacred texts
Reprint (Boston: Tuttle Publishing, 2005) .

(secondary sources)
 
 
 
, modern Japanese translation.

Further reading
 Naumann, Nelly. "Amor und Psyche und der Gott von Miwa". In: Fabula 28, no. Jahresband (1987): 1-33. https://doi.org/10.1515/fabl.1987.28.1.1

Mountains of Nara Prefecture
Sacred mountains of Japan